The 2023 Helvetic Guards season is the inaugural season of the newly founded Helvetic Guards in the European League of Football for the 2023 season.

Preseason
After the Guards were unveiled at a press conference, the franchise began to organize itself for their first season. On October 30, 2022 the front office announced that they will play their home games in the Lidl Arena in Wil, Switzerland, about 25 miles (40km) eastern of Zürich.

As the first head coach of the franchise, former NFL Tennessee Titans offensive coordinator Norm Chow was presented.

With the signings of Collin Hill and 2014 Baylor Bears football team standout Silas Nacita, the franchise recruited standout players in Europe. Notable homegrown signings were of Philipp Leimgruber, former Schwingen player.

Regular season

Standings

Roster

Staff

Notes

References 

Helvetic Guards seasons
Helvetic Guards
Helvetic Guards